The  is the sole squadron of the 2nd Tactical Airlift Group of the Japan Air Self-Defense Force based at Iruma Air Base in Saitama Prefecture, Japan. It is equipped with Kawasaki C-1 and U-4 aircraft.

Tail marking

The squadron's tail marking is the emblem of the 2nd Tactical Airlift Group. The emblem shows an eagle over Japan.

Aircraft operated
 Curtiss C-46 Commando (1968-1978)
 NAMC YS-11（1968-2001）
 Kawasaki C-1（1973-present）
 U-4 (1997-present）
 Kawasaki C-2（2021-present）

References

Units of the Japan Air Self-Defense Force